Minami-kuyakusho-mae is a Hiroden station (tram stop) on Hiroden Hijiyama Line, located in front of Hiroshima Minami Ward Office, in Hijiyama-honmachi, Minami-ku, Hiroshima.

Routes
From Minami-kuyakusho-mae Station, there are one of Hiroden Streetcar routes.

 Hiroshima Station - (via Hijiyama-shita) - Hiroshima Port Route

Connections
█ Hijiyama Line

Hijiyama-bashi — Minami-kuyakusho-mae — Minami-machi 2-chome

Around station
Hiroshima Minami Ward Office
HIROSHIMA FM

History
Opened on March 1, 1982

See also

Hiroden Streetcar Lines and Routes

References 

Minami-kuyakusho-mae Station
Railway stations in Japan opened in 1982